Peter Sedmák (born July 8, 1985) is a Slovak professional basketball player for the Kingspan Královští sokoli of the Kooperativa NBL.

References

External links
 Eurobasket Profile
 RealGM Profile
 FIBA Profile
 BGBasket Profile

1985 births
Living people
Power forwards (basketball)
Slovak expatriate basketball people in Serbia
Slovak men's basketball players
Sportspeople from Poprad
KK Dynamic players
MBK Handlová players